Akhtar Aly Kureshy  (born 15 November 1963) is a Pakistani lawyer, advisor and senior advocate of the Supreme Court of Pakistan who served as Assistant Attorney-General for Pakistan.  He remained Assistant Advocate General Punjab, and Legal Advisor to the Provincial Assembly of the Punjab.

He is a lifetime member of the Supreme Court Bar Association of Pakistan. He remain associated with the Civil Service Academy as Syndicate Advisor to teach and train government officers of the Central Superior Services (CSS).

Early life and education
  
Kureshy was born into a business family, and grew up in Lahore. His father and elder brothers are successful businessmen. He was a social worker in his student time and remained joint secretary and then General Secretary of the Social Welfare Society of Lahore. He graduated from University of the Punjab 1986. He earned his Bachelor of Laws (LL.B.) degree from Punjab Law College in 1990 to become a lawyer. He was first in his family to enter the legal profession as an advocate. His younger daughter Aman Anus followed him to become a lawyer. He received a master's degree in political science from the University of the Punjab in 1992 and diplomas in labor law and intellectual property law. He was a member of the American Center (Library) Lahore where he completed an American history course in 1992 from the American Center, American Embassy Islamabad.

Legal career 
 
In 1992, Kureshy joined the Law Chamber of Ijaz Husain Batalvi, a barrister, who was the public prosecutor in former Prime Minister Zulfikar Ali Bhutto's murder trial case and Defense Counsel in former Prime Minister Nawaz Sharif's plane hijacking case after General Pervez Musharraf's revolt in the 1999 Pakistani coup d'état. and remained with Batalvi until his death on 7 March 2004. Kureshy enrolled as Advocate to the Lahore High Court in 1992 and Advocate to the Supreme Court of Pakistan in 2005. He remained on the Member Executive Lahore High Court Bar Association. He also worked as standing counsel for Pakistan and advisor to the Honorary Consulate General of Kazakhstan Embassy, Lahore. He remain associated with Superior College of Law, Superior University, Presently, he delivers lecture at SOL (School of Law).

Kureshy practices his services in constitutional law, administrative law, banking regulation laws, corporate law matters and criminal law cases. He was deputed and completed various Superior Court assignments, and was appointed by Lahore High Court as an official liquidator, court auctioneer and  Local Commissioner to act on behalf of the Court to resolve pending matters.

Attorney General Office 

The President of Pakistan appointed him as Assistant Attorney General for Pakistan in June 2014 where he interacted and remained the member of Attorney General for Pakistan Salman Aslam Butt, Ashtar Ausaf Ali Attorney General for Pakistan, Naseer Ahmed Bhutta Additional Attorney General. He appeared and conducted numbers of high-profile cases representing Federation of Pakistan such as: Constitutional Writ petitions, ICA (Inter Court Appeal), ECL (Exist Control List), NADRA, Passport, Petroleum Levy, Anti Terrorism, Civil Aviation, Federal Ombudsman.

Advocate General Punjab 
 
In April 2003, Governor of the Punjab appointed Kureshy as the Assistant Advocate General Punjab to represent the Government of Punjab in the Lahore High Court and Supreme Court of Pakistan where he appeared in many cases which were also reported in Law General P.L.D.  SCMR, PLJ and CLC, and MLD. He remained associated with different Advocate Generals like Aftab Ahmad, Khawaja Haris and Raza Farooq. He attended seminars and conferences organized by the Supreme Court of Pakistan.

Assembly Advisor 

He was appointed Legal Advisor to Provincial Assembly of the Punjab in January 1998 – 2000, biggest Assembly of the  province and  Pakistan. Earlier there was no such post and he was the first to serve as Legal Advisor. He interacted with members of the Assembly, Ministers, Parliamentary Secretaries, Deputy Speaker and Speaker of the Assembly. He represented Assembly cases in the Lahore High Court and Supreme Court of Pakistan and gave opinion on legal issues. Kureshy got the chance to assist the Speaker Chaudhry Pervaiz Elahi on the point of Speaker's ruling as Speaker's ruling has the same precedent as judgements of High Courts and Supreme Court. In October 1999, General Pervez Musharraf imposed Marshal Law resultantly all Assemblies and Senate of Pakistan dissolved and his assignment of Legal Advisor was also finished.

Adjunct Professor of Law 
Kureshy followed Ijaz Batalvi's footsteps to teach law by joining Punjab Law College (1998-2001), then Lahore Law College (2004–2007). Since 2007, he is an adjunct professor of law at the Superior College of Law, Superior University, where he regularly teaches the Constitution and Constitutional history of Pakistan.

Associations 
Kureshy is a member of, and actively involved in several social and professional organisations. He contributes through various national and international NGOs, and organizations, like the International Bar Association, London; Commonwealth Lawyers Association, London; member  of LAWASIA Moot, Australia; Focus Pakistan, and the Human Rights Commission of Pakistan.

Who is Who in the World
 
Kureshy appeared in the 18th edition of Marquis Who's Who in the World in 2001. Inclusion of a name is limited to those individuals who have demonstrated outstanding achievements in their own fields of endeavor and who have, thereby, contributed significantly to the betterment of contemporary society.

Syndicate Advisor
Kureshy remain associated as Syndicate Advisor to Civil Services Academy DMG group Lahore 2007–09 to interact and train to newly appointed government officers  of Central Superior Services of Pakistan. There was a group of four to eight students who deputed a special assignment of legal proposition in their final exam, to suggest and present a plausible solution of a national issue through their brilliance and wisdom under the mentorship of their Syndicate Advisor who indulge in to motivate them to get excellence.

Writing 

Kureshy is a regular news columnist on current as well as legal issues, and has been published in national Pakistani newspapers like The News International, The Nation, Daily Jang, The law, Nawaiwaqt, PLJ and PLD and Pakistan Today.

Controversy 

Ashtar Ausaf Ali, Advocate General Punjab, officially sent a summary in March 2012 for the appointment of Kureshy as Additional Advocate General Punjab to the Chief Minister Punjab Shahbaz Sharif in April 2012. Sharif did not approve that summary on the ground that Kureshy belonged to the Chamber of Ijaz Husain Batalvi, who broke the secret of the Sharif family's Exile Agreement with General Pervez Musharraf. According to the Sharif family, the exile agreement was for five years, whereas ex-Prime Minister Shujaat Hussain and Federal Minister Sheikh Rasheed Ahmad gave interviews on Geo News that the exile agreement was of ten years as Ijaz Hussain Batalvi himself had told them. Either the agreement was exile for five years or ten years  but this controversy victimized Akhtar Aly Kureshy, however, the Batalvi family rejected both versions.

References

External links

|-

|-

|-

Living people
Lawyers from Lahore
1963 births
Punjab University Law College alumni
Pakistani columnists
People from Lahore